Go for broke or going for broke may refer to:

Films
 Go for Broke! (1951 film), a film about the 442nd Infantry Regiment
 Go For Broke aka Tutto per tutto, aka All Out (1968 Italian spaghetti Western directed by Umberto Lenzi)
 Going for Broke (1977 film), a Danish film
 Go for Broke (2002 film), a film written by Jean-Claude La Marre
 Going For Broke (2003 film), a 2003 television film starring Delta Burke
 Go for Broke: An Origin Story, a 2018 film; see

Music
 Going for Broke (album), a 1984 album by Eddy Grant
 "Go for Broke", a song in Machine Gun Kelly's album Bloom

Other uses
 "Go For Broke", the unit motto of the US Army's historic 442nd Regimental Combat Team and subsequent use as a rallying cry for the Japanese-American community
 Go For Broke (game), an unlicensed variant on the game Monopoly
 Go for Broke Monument, commemorating Japanese Americans who served in the United States Army during World War II, including the 442nd and the 100th